Albums recorded by singer-actor Jim Nabors. Nabors recorded multiple albums for Columbia Records and Ranwood Records.  Like many  easy listening  pop vocalists of the period Nabors had little U.S. chart singles success. His singles "Love Me With All Your Heart" reached No. 111 in the Cash Box survey (1966), and "The Impossible Dream" hit the top 30 on the Australian Go-Set chart (1968).  His albums were considerably more successful with twelve of them placing on Billboard magazine's Hot 200 chart and three of them earning Nabors gold records between 1968 and 1974.

Albums

Singles

References

Nabors, Jim
Nabors, Jim